Kanalen (The Canal) is a local Norwegian newspaper published in Ulefoss in Telemark county.

History
Kanalen was established by Jan Arve Andersen in 2001, and it has covered events in the municipality of Nome since 2012; prior to this it also covered news in the municipality of Sauherad. It is currently edited by Tor Espen Simonsen. From 2003 to 2012 the newspaper was completely owned by the newspaper Varden. The paper's employees currently hold the majority of shares in the company.

The name Kanalen is derived from the Telemark Canal. The waterway and its locks run across the municipality of Nome and help link together the two largest urban areas, Ulefoss and Lunde. The newspaper serves the same purpose as a channel for media.

Kanalen is neutral in the choice between Bokmål and Nynorsk, but in practice it has been a Bokmål publication since it was launched. The municipality of Nome is composed of towns with very different social, cultural, and historical origins. The newspaper therefore emphasizes news and topical matters, prioritizing political, business, and social journalism.

Kanalen follows the Ethical Code of Practice for the Norwegian Press and distinguishes itself from the local newspaper tradition with a critical and socially oriented approach. The paper is a member of the National Association of Local Newspapers.

Editors
 Jan Arve Andersen (2001–2006)
 Jarle Aaheim (2006–2009)
 Britt Eriksen (2009–2012)
 Tor Espen Simonsen (February 2012–)

Circulation
According to the Norwegian Audit Bureau of Circulations and the National Association of Local Newspapers, Kanalen has had the following annual circulation:
2004: 1,869
2005: 2,130
2006: 2,069
2007: 2,020
2008: 2,049
2009: 1,909
2010: 1,800
2011: 1,744
2012: 1,774
2013: 1,845
2014: 1,893
2015: 1,959
2016: 1,842

References

External links
Kanalen home page

Newspapers published in Norway
Norwegian-language newspapers
Mass media in Telemark
Nome, Norway
Publications established in 2001
2001 establishments in Norway